The  Red Cross of Monaco is the national Red Cross Society of Monaco, founded in 1948 by Louis II of Monaco in the aftermath of the Second World War.

Presidency
 1948 - 1949: Prince Louis of Monaco
 1949 - 1958: Prince Rainier of Monaco
 1958 - 1982: Princess Grace of Monaco
 1982 - present: Prince Albert of Monaco

Fundraising
The Monaco Red Cross's largest fundraising event is the annual Red Cross Gala, which takes place in the Salle des Étoiles of Sporting Monte-Carlo. A yearly clearance sale is also held on "World Cross Day" in May, raising awareness and finances for the charity.

The organization has an annual aid budget of €7,000,000, and assists 20 to 40 counties affected by war, famine, and natural disasters each year.

References

External links
Official Monaco Red Cross Web Site
Red Cross of Monaco - IFRC

Monaco
1948 establishments in Monaco
Organizations established in 1948
Medical and health organisations based in Monaco